Timothy David Jones (born 26 April 1978) is a former English cricketer.  Jones was a right-handed batsman who bowled right-arm medium pace.  He was born at South Shields, Tyne and Wear.

Jones represented the Essex Cricket Board in 3 List A matches.  These came against Ireland in the 1999 NatWest Trophy, the Lancashire Cricket Board and Warwickshire, both of which came in the 2000 NatWest Trophy.  In his 3 List A matches, he scored 46 runs at a batting average of 23.00, with a high score of 29*.   With the ball he took 4 wickets at a bowling average of 26.75, with best figures of 2/36.

References

External links
Timothy Jones at Cricinfo
Timothy Jones at CricketArchive

1978 births
Living people
Cricketers from South Shields
Cricketers from Tyne and Wear
English cricketers
Essex Cricket Board cricketers